Martin Lee and James Trotman defeated Alejandro Hernández and Mariano Puerta in the final, 7–6(7–2), 6–4 to win the boys' doubles tennis title at the 1995 Wimbledon Championships.

Seeds

  Eyal Erlich /  Kepler Orellana (first round)
  Alejandro Hernández /  Mariano Puerta (final)
  Tommy Haas /  Gregg Hill (semifinals)
  Guillermo Cañas /  Martín García (quarterfinals)
  Daniel de Melo /  Ricardo Schlachter (second round)
  Nicolas Kiefer /  Ulrich Jasper Seetzen (quarterfinals)
  Jan-Ralph Brandt /  Peter Wessels (second round)
  Justin Gimelstob /  Ryan Wolters (semifinals)

Draw

Finals

Top half

Bottom half

References

External links

Boys' Doubles
Wimbledon Championship by year – Boys' doubles